Vaipouli College is a secondary school on Savai'i island in Samoa. The college is co-educational, open to male and female students from Year 9 - 13. The college is also known as Salafai College, in reference to Salafai, another name for the island of Savai'i.

Vaipouli College was founded in 1922 as an agricultural college for boys during the colonial administration of the country by New Zealand.

The college is situated in Matautu, 10-minutes inland from Avao village in Gaga'emauga district on the island's central north coast. The scenic drive to the college passes Itu o Tane Secondary School, plantations and Vaipouli Waterfall and river, the main source of water for the people of Matautu.

Vaipouli College is one of nine public secondary schools on the island.

School calendar

2010 School holidays;
15 May - 6 June
4–19 September
11 December - 30 January

See also
List of schools in Savai'i

References

Schools in Samoa
Gaga'emauga